The Church of Our Lady of the Mount is the main church in the civil parish of Monte, in Funchal, Madeira island.

History 

In 1470 a chapel dedicated to Our Lady of the Incarnation was built on this mount by Adão Gonçalves Ferreira, the first man born in Madeira island.

On 10 June 1741, the first stone of the current Church dedicated to Our Lady of the Mount was laid. A few months after the church was completed, the Church was seriously affected by an earthquake on 31 March 1748. It was rebuilt and on 20 December 1818 the Church was finally consecrated by the Archbishop of Meliapor and administrator of the Diocese D. Frei Joaquim de Meneses e Ataíde.

Emperor Charles I of Austria died in exile on Madeira island and was laid to rest in the church.

Festival 

The Assumption of Mary was first celebrated on 15 August 1551 and is one of the biggest festivals still celebrated today on the grounds of the church, where fires are made by locals and local food is made such as Espetada, Bolo do caco, and Bacalhau.

Gallery

References

External links 

Catholic Church in Madeira
Roman Catholic churches completed in 1741
Churches in Madeira
18th-century Roman Catholic church buildings in Portugal
Charles I of Austria